Anthony Mark Mowbray (born 22 November 1963) is an English former professional footballer who is currently the head coach of Sunderland. Mowbray played for Middlesbrough, Celtic and Ipswich Town as a defender.

He began his coaching career with Ipswich Town and took his first managerial job at Scottish Premier League side Hibernian, where he won the Scottish Football Writers' Association Manager of the Year award in his first season. He moved on to West Bromwich Albion in 2006, where he won the Football League Championship in 2008, but then suffered relegation from the Premier League the following year. Mowbray was then appointed as manager of Celtic, but was dismissed after nine months.

Mowbray subsequently took the manager's role at another of his former clubs, Middlesbrough. After a poor start to the 2013–14 season, Mowbray left Middlesbrough in October 2013. After a spell with Coventry City, he was appointed Blackburn Rovers manager in February 2017. He was unable to prevent Rovers being relegated to League One, but then won promotion back to the Championship at the first attempt.

Playing career

Middlesbrough
After playing his first match for the club in 1982, Mowbray became captain of Middlesbrough in 1986 when he was just 22 years old. Affectionately known to Boro fans as "Mogga", Mowbray became a legend in Middlesbrough for being a local lad who led the club from liquidation back into the top league of English football within two seasons.

In 2007, Mowbray was placed at number 7 in a chronological list of Middlesbrough legends compiled by local newspaper the Evening Gazette. The Middlesbrough club fanzine Fly me to the Moon is named after a quote about Mowbray from ex-Middlesbrough manager Bruce Rioch – "If I had to fly to the moon I'd take Tony Mowbray, my captain, with me. He's a magnificent man". In 1991 after 348 appearances for Boro, Mowbray moved to Scottish club Celtic for £1 million.

Celtic
During his playing career with Celtic, Mowbray's wife Bernadette, a native of Renfrewshire, died of breast cancer. The episode is recalled in Mowbray's book, "Kissed by an Angel."  It is often asserted that the "huddle" which Celtic players still perform before each match was arranged as a tribute to Bernadette. However, it was merely suggested by Mowbray on a pre-season tour of Germany to bring the squad together at a time of uncertainty.

Ipswich Town
He later moved on to Ipswich Town, where he played for five years, becoming the team captain. He scored an equalising goal in the 2000 Division One playoff final victory against Barnsley. Ipswich won the match 4–2 and secured promotion to the FA Premier League. This match was both Mowbray's Wembley debut and the last of his playing career.

Coaching career
Once his playing career finished he moved into coaching, starting as a first team coach at Ipswich Town. He had a brief spell as caretaker manager of Ipswich, following the sacking of George Burley and prior to the appointment of Joe Royle.

Hibernian
In May 2004, Mowbray was appointed manager of Hibernian, replacing Bobby Williamson. He gained much acclaim for the job he did, winning the Scottish Football Writers' Association manager of the year award in his first season. Hibs finished in the top four in the SPL in his only two full seasons in charge, which was the first time that Hibs had done this in the top division in consecutive seasons since Eddie Turnbull was manager.

Hibs progressed to the later stages of every domestic cup competition in his tenure and made two appearances in European football. Hibs lost heavily to Dnipro Dnipropetrovsk in the first round of the 2005–06 UEFA Cup and on the away goals rule to OB Odense in the 2006 Intertoto Cup. During mid-2006, Mowbray was interviewed for the vacant managerial position at Ipswich Town, but he rejected their approach. In September 2006 he signed a 12-month rolling deal with Hibs that was due to take effect from July 2007. Just one month later however, Mowbray moved to West Bromwich Albion.

West Bromwich Albion
West Bromwich Albion appointed Mowbray as their manager on 13 October 2006. Mowbray faced the task of returning the Baggies to the Premier League after relegation the previous season. Although he managed to turn around the club's poor away form, an indifferent run of results at home towards the end of the season meant that Albion finished fourth in The Championship table behind Sunderland, Birmingham City and Derby County, and faced the lottery of the Championship play-offs. Despite two famous victories over old rivals Wolverhampton Wanderers in the semi finals, Albion lost 1–0 to Derby County in the Wembley final.

As a result, during the close season, Mowbray set about restructuring his squad, moving out several of Robson's players for multimillion-pound fees, after press reports of dressing room division.

High-profile players such as Jason Koumas, Diomansy Kamara and Curtis Davies were sold to Premier League clubs for large fees, in addition to the departures of Paul McShane, Nathan Ellington, Darren Carter and Steve Watson. Mowbray replaced them by signing a total of 14 permanent and loan players in the summer transfer window, making an overall profit in the process. His most expensive signings were Chris Brunt from Sheffield Wednesday for £3 million, Leon Barnett from Luton Town for £2.5 million, and James Morrison from Middlesbrough for £1.5 million.

Despite the large changes in his squad, Mowbray won the Championship Manager of the Month award in September 2007, after Albion gained 13 out of the maximum 15 points and climbed to 2nd in the Division.

At the start of 2008, Mowbray's young Albion team topped the table, receiving growing plaudits from the media and supporters alike for their attractive brand of attacking one touch passing football, a reflection of Mowbray's staunch footballing philosophy.

Mowbray guided West Brom to the EFL Championship title, meaning promotion to the Premier League and reached the semi-final of the FA Cup. The semi-final, the first to be played at the new Wembley Stadium, pitted West Brom against Portsmouth, the only remaining Premier League team left in the FA Cup. Portsmouth won the match 1–0 with the only goal of the game coming from Kanu. Mowbray won the Championship manager of the month award for April, as well as the League Managers Association manager of the year award.

After a poor 2008–09 season, West Bromwich were relegated from the Premier League, finishing 20th. Mowbray was still thought highly of by the fans, however, and this was evidenced by them wearing Mowbray masks at their last game of the season. Mowbray left the club for Celtic shortly afterwards.

Celtic

On 8 June 2009, it was reported that Celtic had approached West Bromwich Albion for permission to speak to Mowbray about their managerial vacancy. A compensation fee of £2 million was agreed, and Celtic declared Mowbray as their new manager on 16 June 2009. He was unveiled as Celtic manager at a press conference a day later. His coaching team was Neil Lennon, Peter Grant, Mark Venus, and Stevie Woods. On 12 September 2009 was named as the Coach of the Month of August in the Scottish Premier League.

Mowbray was described as "beleaguered" by The Herald after Celtic fell 10 points behind Old Firm rivals Rangers in the SPL title race after a 2–1 home defeat by Hibs.

Mowbray decided to make significant changes to his squad during the January 2010 transfer window, selling Gary Caldwell and Barry Robson, which apparently caused disruption to the team in the immediate aftermath of those deals being completed. Robbie Keane was recruited early in 2010 on a loan deal from Tottenham Hotspur amid great excitement, however further poor results, particularly a record 4–0 defeat by St Mirren, led to Mowbray being sacked on 25 March. It was reported in May 2010 that Celtic had yet to agree compensation with Mowbray and his management team.

Middlesbrough
Mowbray was appointed Middlesbrough manager on 26 October 2010, replacing Gordon Strachan. He lost his first match in charge, 2–1 against Bristol City, but followed this with wins against Crystal Palace and Scunthorpe. Mowbray guided Boro to Championship safety, having joined the club when they were 22nd in the league. The club finished the season well, winning their last four league games and finished 12th in the league table. The same season, Mowbray started giving youngsters a first team place such as Joe Bennett, Luke Williams and Richard Smallwood. Mowbray also started giving Marvin Emnes more playing time after returning on loan from Swansea City.

Middlesbrough began the 2011–12 season well and Mowbray won manager of the month for September. Middlesbrough relinquished the only unbeaten record in the league after a 2–0 defeat to Nottingham Forest in October 2011. After a poor start to 2012, Middlesbrough's form picked up in late February with four wins in five games. Middlesbrough finished 7th in the 2011–12 season, missing out on a play-off place by one position.

After an unbeaten run in October 2012, Mowbray won the accolade of Championship Manager of the Month for that month. On 21 October 2013, it was announced that Mowbray had left the club with immediate effect after a run of two wins in 12 games in the 2013–14 campaign.

Coventry City
On 3 March 2015, Mowbray was appointed manager of Coventry City on a deal until the end of the 2014–15 season. With the club facing the possibility of relegation to the fourth-tier for the first time since the late 1950s, Tony Mowbray's initial brief was to keep the club in the third-tier. A final day victory away at Crawley Town was enough for Mowbray to secure League One football for the Sky Blues for the 2015–16 season.

Following protracted negotiations at the end of the season, Tony Mowbray agreed to sign a two-year contract extension to remain as Coventry City manager.

Mowbray resigned from Coventry City on 29 September 2016 after a string of results without a win.

Blackburn Rovers
On 22 February 2017, Mowbray was appointed head coach of Blackburn Rovers on an 18-month contract, effectively lasting until the end of the 2017–18 season. Despite an improvement in form that offered some hope of survival, Blackburn were relegated to League One at the end of the 2016–17 season.

Mowbray signed a new contract that would keep him at the club until 2019, with an option of a further 12 months after that as well. Under his managership, Blackburn won promotion back to the Championship after a single year in League One. Their promotion was assured on 24 April, after a 1–0 away win against Doncaster Rovers.

In the 2018–19 season Mowbray led Blackburn to a final finish of 15th in the Championship. In the EFL Cup they reached the third round before being eliminated at AFC Bournemouth. In the FA Cup Blackburn were eliminated in the third round after extra time in a replay against Newcastle United.

In the 2019–20 season Mowbray secured an 11th-place finish in the Championship. In the EFL Cup they reached the second round before defeat at Sheffield United. The club were beaten in the third round of the FA Cup at fellow Championship side Birmingham City.
Mowbray left Blackburn at the conclusion of his contract in May 2022 and was replaced by Jon Dahl Tomasson as head coach. He had served five years in the post.

Sunderland
On 30 August 2022, Mowbray was appointed head coach of Sunderland replacing Alex Neil.

Personal life
Mowbray has three sons with his wife, Amber Mowbray. His first wife, Bernadette Doyle Mowbray, died of breast cancer on New Year's Day 1995, aged 26. Mowbray's brother Darren is the current head of recruitment for Aberdeen.

Career statistics
Source:

Managerial statistics

Honours

Playing career
Middlesbrough
 Football League Third Division Runner-Up: 1986–87
 Football League Second Division 3rd Place: 1987–88

Ipswich Town
Football League First Division play-offs: 2000

Individual
Middlesbrough Player of the Year: 1984–85, 1985–86
PFA Team of the Year: 1987–88 Second Division
Ipswich Town Hall of Fame: Inducted 2016

Managerial career
West Bromwich Albion
 Football League Championship: 2007–08

Blackburn Rovers
 Football League One runner-up: 2017–18

Individual Awards
Scottish Premier League Manager of the Month: December 2004, May 2005, November 2005, August 2009
 Scottish Football Writers' Association Manager of the Year: 2004–2005
Scottish Premier League Manager of the Year: 2004–2005
 BBC Scotland Off The Ball Manager of the Year: 2004–2005
 League Managers Association Manager of the Year: 2007–2008
 BBC North East Sports Personality of the Year: 2011.
 Football League Championship Manager of the Month: September 2007, October 2012 and January 2019.
 Football League One Manager of the Month: November 2017.

References

1963 births
Celtic F.C. managers
Celtic F.C. players
England B international footballers
English football managers
English footballers
Footballers from North Yorkshire
Association football defenders
Hibernian F.C. managers
Ipswich Town F.C. players
Living people
Middlesbrough F.C. managers
Middlesbrough F.C. players
Premier League managers
People from Saltburn-by-the-Sea
Scottish Football League players
Scottish Premier League managers
English Football League players
West Bromwich Albion F.C. managers
Coventry City F.C. managers
Blackburn Rovers F.C. managers
English Football League managers